Thoropa megatympanum is a species of frog in the family Cycloramphidae.
It is endemic to Brazil.
Its natural habitats are subtropical or tropical seasonally wet or flooded lowland grassland, rivers, and rocky areas.
It is threatened by habitat loss.

References

megatympanum
Endemic fauna of Brazil
Amphibians of Brazil
Taxonomy articles created by Polbot
Amphibians described in 1984
Taxa named by Ulisses Caramaschi